Akalamdug (A-KALAM-DUG) was an early ruler of the First Dynasty of Ur in the 26th century BCE. He does not appear in the Sumerian King List, but is known from his tomb (Tomb 1332) and an inscription at the Royal Cemetery at Ur. He may have been the father of Meskalamdug, as suggested by the similarity of their names and the chronological proximity of their graves. Alternatively, he may have been the son of Meskalamdug, and therefore brother of the great ruler Mesannepada.

Artefacts
Several artefacts are known from tomb 1332 at the Royal Cemetery at Ur, such as bull heads and decorated shell plaques from a lyre.

See also

Sumer
History of Sumer
Royal Cemetery at Ur
Near Eastern archaeology

References

Sources
Jane McIntosh: Ancient Mesopotamia. ABC-CLIO 2005, p. 73 (restricted online version (google books))
Leonard Woolley: The Sumerians. p. 38 (restricted online version (google books))

External links
Meskalamdug at Bartleby.com (Text snippet from  The Encyclopedia of World History (2001))

26th-century BC Sumerian kings
Sumerian kings
First Dynasty of Ur